Venice for Lovers is a collection of essays and travel impressions about the city of Venice in Italy, written by Louis Begley and wife Anka Muhlstein.

Overview
Every year for all the 30 years they have been married, the couple spends long, enjoyable months in Venice. They write and live there and over the decades La Serenissima has become their second home. The owners of their favourite restaurants have become their friends and they share the lives of the locals, far off the beaten tourist tracks, as Muhlstein describes in her contribution to this book.

Louis Begley tells the story of how he fell in love with and in Venice. He is not the only one who did, as his literary essay on the city's place in world literature demonstrates: Henry James, Marcel Proust and Thomas Mann are only the most illustrious predecessors.

Originally written in German and French, the authors revised the English edition, adding extra material. The book is a very private view of a place, which will forever inspire dreams of love and passion.

Excerpt

The last section of the book is written singlehanded by Louis Begley and is entitled Venice: Reflections of a Novelist and opens thus:

See also

List of architecture monuments of Venice
List of painters and architects of Venice
Su e zo per i ponti
Veneti and Venetic language (the ancient spoken language of the region)
Venetian glass
Venetian language (the modern spoken vernacular of the region)
Venice Biennale
Venice Film Festival
 Several European cities have been compared to Venice: The Breton city Nantes has been called The Venice of the West, while the nickname The Venice of the North has been variously applied to Amsterdam, Birmingham, Bornholm, Bruges, Haapsalu, Maryhill, Saint Petersburg and Stockholm.

References

External links

Official Site of the City of Venice
Activities in Venice

2005 books
Jewish American literature
Books about Venice
Culture in Venice